Gunville is an unincorporated community in Mason County, West Virginia, United States.

A post office called Gunville was established in 1888, and remained in operation until being  discontinued in 1909.

References 

Unincorporated communities in West Virginia
Unincorporated communities in Mason County, West Virginia